The Battle of Kannauj took place at Kannauj, Uttar Pradesh, India between Sher Shah Suri and Humayun on 17 May 1540. This battle is also known as the battle of Bilgram, Humayun was defeated by Sher Shah Suri in the battle.

Background 
On 26 June 1539, the army led by Sher Shah Suri destroyed the Mughal forces which were led by Humayun at the Battle of Chausa. Mughal Emperor Humayun fled the incident jumping in the Ganges and saved his life somehow. Losing at the battle of Chausa, Humayun came back to Agra asking for assistance of his brothers to challenge Sher Shah Suri again. One of his brothers Hindal Mirza assured Humayun to support with his army. But Humayun’s other brother named Kamran Mirza did not agree to send his army while Humayun was commanding, because Kamran Mirza wanted to take control of the throne himself. Afterwards, Kamran could not manage to take control of the power from his brother Humayun and moved to Lahore taking his army with him. Yet Humayun gathered quite sufficient forces to fight against Sher Shah Suri. Sher Khan declared himself Sultan with the victory in the battle of Chausa. He gained more power and prestige and took the title Sher Shah while Humayun and his brothers were misspending their time with futile arguments.

Battle 
Humayun went to face Sher Shah again at the battlefield of Kannauj taking two brothers Askari Mirza and Hindal Mirza with him. These two groups fought each other on 17 May 1540. Humayun’s artillery could not prove its potential, besides Humayun’s repetition of tactical errors and taking wrong decisions (the decisions he made during the battle of Chausa) made him a loser once again. Sher Shah defeated the Mughal force for the second time in the battle of Kannauj. Again, Humayun along with his brothers fled the battlefield to save their lives and went back to Agra.

Aftermath 
Humayun became almost a fugitive after the battle of Kannauj. He and his brothers reached Agra safely but they could not stay there because Sher Shah chased them with his forces. He did not even get to Lahore when he heard about losing Delhi and Agra to Sher Shah. Sher Shah became the sultan of Agra and Delhi. Humayun met his brothers in Lahore but they could not gather a force to fight Sher Khan because they all had different personal interests. Kamran became concerned with the safety of Punjab and Afghanistan and Hindal wanted to take control of Sindh. After the battle of Kannauj, Humayun spent the next 15 years of his life in exile.

Mirza Muhammad Haidar Dughlat, writing in the Tarikh-i-Rashidi, attributed the defeat of Humayun's army to the unsound judgment and lack of foresight of his emirs, whom he believed were hardly worthy of the title at all. Having been present at the battle, he derided the Mughal forces as being severely hindered by the promotion of unqualified, worthless individuals to positions of high military authority.

See also 
 Bilgram
 Battle of Chausa
 Kannauj
 Sher Shah Suri
 Humayun
 Delhi Sultanate

References 

Kannauj
History of Uttar Pradesh